Joy Harjo (born May 9, 1951) is an American poet, musician, playwright, and author. She served as the 23rd United States Poet Laureate, the first Native American to hold that honor. She was also only the second Poet Laureate Consultant in Poetry to have served three terms (after Robert Pinsky). Harjo is a member of the Muscogee Nation (Este Mvskokvlke) and belongs to Oce Vpofv (Hickory Ground). She is an important figure in the second wave of the literary Native American Renaissance of the late 20th century. She studied at the Institute of American Indian Arts, completed her undergraduate degree at University of New Mexico in 1976, and earned an MFA degree at the University of Iowa in its creative writing program.

In addition to writing books and other publications, Harjo has taught in numerous United States universities, performed internationally at poetry readings and music events, and released seven albums of her original music. Harjo is the author of ten books of poetry, and three children's books, The Good Luck Cat, For a Girl Becoming, and most recently, Remember (2023). Her books include Weaving Sundown in a Scarlet Light (2022), Catching the Light (2022), Poet Warrior (2021), An American Sunrise (2019), Conflict Resolution for Holy Beings (2015), Crazy Brave (2012), and How We Became Human: New and Selected Poems 1975–2002 (2004), among others. 

She is the recipient of the 2023 Bollingen Prize for American Poetry, the 2023 Harper Lee Award, the 2023 Ivan Sandrof Lifetime Achievement Award from the National Book Critics Circle, the 2022 Lifetime Achievement Award from the Americans for the Arts, a 2022 Leadership Award from the Academy of American Poets, a 2019 Jackson Prize from Poets & Writers, the 2017 Ruth Lilly Poetry Prize, the Academy of American Poets Wallace Stevens Award, two fellowships from the National Endowment for the Arts, a Guggenheim Fellowship, and a Tulsa Artist Fellowship, among other honors. 

In 2019, she was elected a chancellor of the Academy of American Poets and has since been inducted into the Oklahoma Hall of Fame, the National Women's Hall of Fame, and the Native American Hall of Fame. She has also been designated as the 14th Oklahoma Cultural Treasure at the 44th Oklahoma Governor's Arts Awards. Harjo founded For Girls Becoming, an art mentorship program for young Mvskoke women and is a Founding Board Member and Chair of the Native Arts & Cultures Foundation.

Her signature project as U.S. Poet Laureate was called Living Nations, Living Words: A Map of First Peoples Poetry; it focused on "mapping the U.S. with Native Nations poets and poems".

Early life and education 

Harjo was born on May 9, 1951, in Tulsa, Oklahoma. Her father, Allen W. Foster, was Muscogee, and her mother, Wynema Baker Foster, was Cherokee and European-American from Arkansas. Harjo is a member of the Muscogee (Creek) Nation.

At the age of 16, Harjo attended the Institute of American Indian Arts, which at the time was a BIA boarding school, in Santa Fe, New Mexico, for high school. Harjo loved painting and found that it gave her a way to express herself. Harjo was inspired by her great-aunt, Lois Harjo Ball, who was a painter.

Harjo enrolled as a pre-med student the University of New Mexico. She changed her major to art after her first year. During her last year, she switched to creative writing, as she was inspired by different Native American writers. She graduated in 1976. Harjo earned her master of fine arts degree in creative writing from the University of Iowa in 1978. She also took filmmaking classes at the Anthropology Film Center in Santa Fe, New Mexico.

Career 
Harjo taught at the Institute of American Indian Arts from 1978 to 1979 and 1983 to 1984. She taught at Arizona State University from 1980 to 1981, the University of Colorado from 1985 to 1988, the University of Arizona from 1988 to 1990, the University of New Mexico from 1991 to 1997 and later from 2005 to 2010, UCLA in 1998 and from 2001 to 2005, University of Southern Maine, Stonecoast Low Residency MFA Program from 2011-2012, University of Illinois, Urbana-Champaign from 2013 to 2016, and University of Tennessee, Knoxville from 2016 to 2018. Her students at the University of New Mexico included future Congresswoman and Secretary of the Interior Deb Haaland.

Harjo has played alto saxophone with the band Poetic Justice, edited literary journals and anthologies, and written screenplays, plays, and children's books. Harjo performs now with her saxophone and flutes, solo and with pulled-together players she often calls the Arrow Dynamics Band.

In 1995, Harjo received the Lifetime Achievement Award from the Native Writers' Circle of the Americas.

In 2002, Harjo received the PEN/Beyond Margins Award for A Map to the Next World: Poetry and Tales. In 2008, she served as a founding member of the board of directors for the Native Arts and Cultures Foundation, for which she serves as a member of its National Advisory Council.

Harjo joined the faculty of the American Indian Studies Program at the University of Illinois at Urbana-Champaign in January 2013.

In 2016, Harjo was appointed to the Chair of Excellence in the Department of English at the University of Tennessee, Knoxville.

In 2018, Harjo was awarded a Tulsa Artist Fellowship.

In 2019, Harjo was appointed Board Chair for the Native Arts & Cultures Foundation.

In 2019, Harjo was named the United States Poet Laureate. She was the first Native American to be so appointed. She was also the second United States Poet Laureate Consultant in Poetry to serve three terms.

In 2019, Harjo was appointed Chancellor for the Academy of American Poets. 

In 2022, Harjo was appointed as the first artist-in-residence for the Bob Dylan Center in Tulsa, Oklahoma.

Harjo has been inducted into the National Women’s Hall of Fame, National Native American Hall of Fame, the Oklahoma Hall of Fame, the American Philosophical Society, the American Academy of Arts and Sciences, and the American Academy of Arts and Letters

Literature and performance 
Harjo has written numerous works in the genres of poetry, books, and plays. Harjo's works often include themes such as defining self, the arts, and social justice.

Harjo uses Native American oral history as a mechanism for portraying these issues, and believes that "written text is, for [her], fixed orality". Her use of the oral tradition is prevalent through various literature readings and musical performances conducted by Harjo. Her methods of continuing oral tradition include story-telling, singing, and voice inflection in order to captivate the attention of her audiences. While reading poetry, she claims that "[she] starts not even with an image but a sound," which is indicative of her oral traditions expressed in performance.

Harjo published her first volume in 1975, titled The Last Song, which consisted of nine of her poems. Harjo has since authored ten books of poet­ry, including her most recent, Weaving Sundown in a Scarlet Light: 50 Poems for 50 Years (2022), the highly acclaimed An American Sun­rise (2019), which was a 2020 Oklahoma Book Award Winner; Conflict Res­o­lution for Holy Beings (2015), which was shortlisted for the Griffin Prize and named a Notable Book of the Year by the American Library Associ­a­tion; and In Mad Love and War (1990), which received an American Book Award and the Delmore Schwartz Memo­r­i­al Award. Her first mem­oir, Crazy Brave, was awarded the PEN USA Liter­ary Award in Cre­ative Non Fiction and the American Book Award, and her second, Poet Warrior, was released from W.W. Norton in Fall 2021.

She has published three award-winning children's books, The Good Luck Cat, For a Girl Becoming, and Remember; a collab­o­ration with photographer/​astronomer Stephen Strom; three anthol­o­gies of writing by North American Native Nations writers; sever­al screenplays and collections of prose interviews and essays, and three plays, including Wings of Night Sky, Wings of Morning Light, A Play, which she toured as a one-woman show and was published by Wesleyan Press.

Harjo is Executive Editor of the anthol­o­gy When the Light of the World was Subdued, Our Songs Came Through — A Norton Anthol­o­gy of Native Nations Poet­ry and the editor of Living Nations, Living Words: An Anthology of First Peoples Poetry, the companion anthology to her signature Poet Laureate project featuring a sampling of work by 47 Native Nations poets through an interactive ArcGIS Story Map and a newly developed Library of Congress audio collection.

Harjo's awards for poetry include Yale's 2023 Bollingen Prize for American Poetry, the 2022 Ivan Sandrof Liftetime Achievement Award from the National Books Critics Cirlce, the Ruth Lily Prize for Lifetime Achievement from the Poetry Foundation, the Academy of American Poets Wallace Stevens Award, the New Mexico Governor's Award for Excellence in the Arts, a PEN USA Literary Award, Lila Wallace-Reader's Digest Fund Writers’ Award, the Poets & Writers Jackson Poet­ry Prize, a Rasmuson US Artist Fellowship, two NEA fellowships, and a Guggenheim Fellowship. Her poetry is included on a plaque on LUCY, a NASA spacecraft launched in Fall 2021 and the first reconnaissance of the Jupiter Trojans.

She is a chancellor of the Academy of American Poets, Board of Directors Chair of the Native Arts & Cultures Foundation, and is the first Artist-in-Residence for Tulsa's Bob Dylan Center.

Poetry 
In the early stages of adolescence is when Joy Harjo's hardships started fairly quickly. Her family was challenged by her father's struggle with alcohol as well as an abusive stepfather. From this started her journey into the arts. She started painting as a way to express herself. After getting kicked out by her stepfather at the young age of 16, She attended school at the institute of Native American Arts in New Mexico where she worked to change the light in which Native American art was presented. From there, she became a creative writing major in college and focused on her passion of poetry after listening to Native American poets. She began writing poetry at twenty-two, and released her first book of poems called The Last Song, which started her career in writing. Her most recent collection, Weaving Sundown in a Scarlet Light (W.W. Norton 2022) celebrates Harjo's 50 years of writing poetry since her first publication.

Music 

As a musician, Harjo has released seven CDs. These feature both her original music and that of other Native American artists.

Since her first album, a spoken word classic Letter From the End of the Twentieth Century (2003) and her 1998 solo album Native Joy for Real, Harjo has received numerous awards and recognitions for her music, including a Native American Music Award (NAMMY) for Best Female Artist of the year for her 2008 album, Winding Through the Milky Way. I Pray for My Enemies is Joy Harjo's seventh and newest album, released in 2021.

Harjo performs with her saxophone and flutes, solo and with pulled-together players she often calls the Arrow Dynamics Band. She has performed in Europe, South America, India, and Africa, as well as for a range of North American stages, including the Vancouver Folk Music Festival, the Cultural Olympiad at the 1996 Summer Olympics in Atlanta, the 2010 Olympics in Vancouver, DEF Poetry Jam, and the U.S. Library of Congress in Washington D.C.

She began to play the saxophone at the age of 40. Harjo believes that when reading her poems, she can add music by playing the sax and reach the heart of the listener in a different way. When reading her poems, she speaks with a musical tone in her voice, creating a song in every poem.

Activism 

In addition to her creative writing, Harjo has written and spoken about US political and Native American affairs. She is also an active member of the Muscogee Nation and writes poetry as "a voice of the Indigenous people".

Harjo's poetry explores imperialism and colonization, and their effects on violence against women. Scholar Mishuana Goeman writes, "The rich intertextuality of Harjo's poems and her intense connections with other and awareness of Native issues- such as sovereignty, racial formation, and social conditions- provide the foundation for unpacking and linking the function of settler colonial structures within newly arranged global spaces".

In her poems, Harjo often explores her Muskogee/Creek background and spirituality in opposition to popular mainstream culture. In a thesis at Iowa University, Eloisa Valenzuela-Mendoza writes about Harjo, "Native American continuation in the face of colonization is the undercurrent of Harjo’s poetics through poetry, music, and performance." Harjo's work touches upon land rights for Native Americans and the gravity of the disappearance of "her people", while rejecting former narratives that erased Native American histories.

Much of Harjo's work reflects Creek values, myths, and beliefs. Harjo reaches readers and audiences to bring realization of the wrongs of the past, not only for Native American communities but for oppressed communities in general. Her activism for Native American rights and feminism stem from her belief in unity and the lack of separation among human, animal, plant, sky, and earth. Harjo believes that we become most human when we understand the connection among all living things. She believes that colonialism led to Native American women being oppressed within their own communities, and she works to encourage more political equality between the sexes.

Of contemporary American poetry, Harjo said, "I see and hear the presence of generations making poetry through the many cultures that express America. They range from ceremonial orality which might occur from spoken word to European fixed forms; to the many classic traditions that occur in all cultures, including theoretical abstract forms that find resonance on the page or in image. Poetry always directly or inadvertently mirrors the state of the state either directly or sideways. Terrance Hayes’s American sonnets make a stand as post-election love poems. Layli Long Soldier’s poems emerge from fields of Lakota history where centuries stack and bleed through making new songs. The sacred and profane tangle and are threaded into the lands guarded by the four sacred mountains in the poetry of Sherwin Bitsui. America has always been multicultural, before the term became ubiquitous, before colonization, and it will be after."

Personal life 
In 1969 at the Institute of American Indian Arts, Harjo met fellow student Phil Wilmon, with whom she had a son, Phil Dayn (born 1969). Their relationship ended by 1971. In 1972, she met poet Simon Ortiz of the Acoma Pueblo tribe, with whom she had a daughter, Rainy Dawn (born 1973). She raised both her children as a single mother.

Harjo is married to Owen Chopoksa Sapulpa, and is stepmother to his children.

Awards

1970s 
 1st and 2nd Place Awards in Drawing, University of New Mexico Kiva Club Nizhoni Days Art Show (1976)
 Writers Forum at the University of Colorado, Colorado Springs, Colorado (1977)
 Outstanding Young Women of America (1978)
 National Endowment for the Arts Creative Writing Fellowships (1978)

1980s 
 1st Place in Poetry in the Santa Fe Festival of the Arts (1980)
 Outstanding Young Women of America (1984)
 New Mexico Music Awards (1987)
 NEH Summer Stipend in American Indian Literature and Verbal Arts, University of Arizona (1987)
 Arizona Commission on the Arts Poetry Fellowship (1989)

1990s 
 The American Indian Distinguished Achievement in the Arts Award (1990)
 Delmore Schwartz Memorial Award, New York University: In Mad Love and War (1991)
 Oakland PEN, Josephine Miles Poetry Award (1991)
 William Carlos Williams Award from the Poetry Society of America (1991)
 American Book Award from the Before Columbus Foundation: In Mad Love and War (1991)
 Honorary Doctorate from Benedictine College (1992)
 Woodrow Wilson Fellowship at Green Mountain College in Poultney, Vermont (1993)
 Witter Bynner Poetry Fellowship (1994)
 Lifetime Achievement Award from the Native Writers Circle of The Americas (1995)
 Oklahoma Book Award: The Woman Who Fell from the Sky (1995)
 Bravo Award from the Albuquerque Arts Alliance (1996)
 Wordcraft Circle of Native Writers and Storytellers Musical Artist of the Year: Poetic Justice (1997)
 New Mexico Governor's Award for Excellence in the Arts (1997)
St. Mary-in-the-Woods College Honorary Doctoral Degree (1998)
 Lila Wallace-Reader's Digest Fund Writer's Award for work with nonprofit group Atlatl in bringing literary resources to Native American communities (1998)
 Finalist for the Oklahoma Book Award: Reinventing the Enemy's Language (1998)
 National Endowment for the Arts Creative Writing Fellowships (1998)
 The Myers Center Award for the Study of Human Rights in North America, with Gloria Bird for Reinventing the Enemy’s Language, 1998

2000s 
 Writer of the Year/children's books by the Wordcraft Circle of Native Writers and Storytellers for The Good Luck Cat (2001)
 Oklahoma Book Award for Poetry for How We Became Human: New and Selected Poems 1975–2001 (2003)
 Arrell Gibson Award for Lifetime Achievement from the Oklahoma Center for the Book for How We Became Human: New and Selected Poems 1975–2001 (2003)
Eagle Spirit Achievement Award, American Indian Film Festival, 2002
Nominee, Best Music Video (“Eagle Song”), American Indian Film Festival, 2002
Nominee, PEN/Voelcker Award for Poetry, for A Map to the Next World, 2002.
Mountains and Plains Booksellers Award
Wordcraft Circle of Native Writers and Storytellers, Writer of the Year for A Love Supreme (2003-2004)
 Storyteller of the Year, Wordcraft Circle of Native Writers and Storytellers (2004)
 Wordcraft Circle of Native Writers and Storytellers, Writer of the Year for the script A Thousand Roads (2005)
 The Premio Fronterizo Prize, Borders Festival, Las Cruces, NM, 2005
 Native American Music Award, Native Contemporary Song (2008)
Native American Music Award, Native Contemporary Song and Best World Music Song (2009)
Native American Music Award (NAMMY) Best Female Artist of the Year (2009)
United States Artists Rasmuson Fellows Award (2009)
 Eagle Spirit Achievement Award (2009)

2010s 
 Indian Summer Music Award for Best Contemporary Instrumental, for “Rainbow Gratitude” from the album Red Dreams, A Trail Beyond Tears (2011)
 Mvskoke Women's Leadership Award (2011)
 2011 Aboriginal Music Awards, Finalist for Best Flute Album (2011)
 Mvskoke Creek Nation Hall of Fame Induction (2012)
American Book Award, Before Columbus Foundation for Crazy Brave (2013)
PEN USA Literary Award in Creative Nonfiction for Crazy Brave (2013)
Black Earth Institute Award (2014)
 John Simon Guggenheim Memorial Foundation Fellowship (2014)
 Oklahoma Writers Hall of Fame (2014)
 Wallace Stevens Award in Poetry by the Academy of American Poets Board of Chancellors (2015)
 American Library Association Notable book: Conflict Resolution for Holy Beings
Conflict Resolution for Holy Beings - Shortlisted for the 2016 Griffin Poetry Prize
Ruth Lilly Poetry Prize (2017)
The 2019 Jackson Prize, Poets & Writers (2019)
Association of Tribal Archives, Libraries, and Museums (ATALM) Literary Award, 2019
Tulsan of the Year, 2019, TulsaWorld
 United States Poet Laureate (2019)

2020s 
Oklahoma Book Award for An American Sunrise (2020)
Institute of American Indian Arts Honorary Doctoral Degree (2020)
Association for Women in Communication International Matrix Award (2021)
Association for Women in Communication, Tulsa Professional Chapter - Saidie Award for Lifetime Achievement Newsmaker Award (2021)
SUNY Buffalo Honorary Doctoral Degree (2021)
UNC Asheville Honorary Doctoral Degree (2021)
University of Pennsylvania Honorary Doctoral Degree (2021)
Smith College Honorary Doctoral Degree (2021)
PEN Oakland 2021 Josephine Miles Award for When the Light of the World WasSubdued Our Songs Came Through (2021)
31st Annual Reading the West Book Award for Poetry, When the Light of the World Was Subdued Our Songs Came Through (2021)
Inductee, National Women's Hall of Fame (2021)
Inductee, Native American Hall of Fame (2021)
Designation as the 14th Oklahoma Cultural Treasure at the 44th Oklahoma Governor's Arts Awards (2021)
YWCA Pinnacle Awards' 2022 Anna C. Roth Legacy Award
University of Tennessee Knoxville Honorary Doctoral Degree (2022)
Inductee, Oklahoma Hall of Fame (2022)
Academy of American Poets Leadership Award (2022)
Americans for the Arts, 2022 National Arts Awards, Lifetime Achievement Award, October 2022
32nd Annual Reading the West Book Award for Nonfiction - Poet Warrior (2022)
Ivan Sandrof Lifetime Achievement Award, National Book Critics Circle (2023)
The 2023 Bollingen Prize for American Poetry, Yale University, for Weaving Sundown in a Scarlet Light and for lifetime achievement in and contributions to American poetry.
2023 Harper Lee Award

Others 
 Inaugural Artist-in-Residence, Bob Dylan Center, Tulsa, Oklahoma (2022)
 American Academy of Arts and Letters, Elected Member, Department of Literature (2021)
American Philosophical Society, Elected Member (2021)
American Academy of Art and Sciences, Member Appointment (2020)
Chancellor, Academy of American Poets, Member Appointment (2019)
Poetry included on plaque of LUCY, a NASA spacecraft launched in Fall 2021 and the first reconnaissance of the Jupiter Trojans
Tulsa Artist Fellowship (2018-2021)
Joy Harjo has received honorary doctorates from the following: 
University of Tennessee, Knoxville, 2022
SUNY Buffalo Honorary Doctoral Degree, 2021
UNC Asheville Honorary Doctoral Degree, 2021
University of Pennsylvania Honorary Doctoral Degree, 2021
Smith College Honorary Doctoral Degree, 2021
Institute of American Indian Arts Honorary Doctoral Degree, 2020
St. Mary-in-the-Woods College Honorary Doctoral Degree, 1998
Benedictine College, Kansas Honorary Doctoral Degree, 1992

Works

Bibliography

Poetic works 
 .
 .
 .
 ; W. W. Norton & Company, 2008, .
 .
 .
 .
 .
 .
 .
 . (shortlisted for the 2016 Griffin Poetry Prize)
 .
 Weaving Sundown in a Scarlet Light: 50 Poems for 50 Years, W.W. Norton & Company, 2022, ISBN 978-1324036487.

As editor 
 .

Plays

Non-fiction 
 .

 .
.
Catching the Light, Yale University Press, Why I Write Series, 2022, ISBN 978-0300257038.

Children's literature 
 .
 .
 Remember, Penguin Random House, 2023, ISBN 978-0-593484845.

Discography

Solo albums 

 Letter from the End of the Twentieth Century (2003)
 Native Joy for Real (2004)
 She Had Some Horses (2006)
 Winding Through the Milky Way (2008)
 Red Dreams, A Trail Beyond Tears (2010)
This America (2011)
I Pray For My Enemies (2021)

Joy Harjo and Poetic Justice 
 Letter from the End of the Twentieth Century (1997)

See also 

 List of writers from peoples indigenous to the Americas
 Native American Studies

Notes

References 
 
 
 
 
 Azfar Hussain. "Joy Harjo and Her Poetics as Praxis: A 'Postcolonial' Political Economy of the Body, Land, Labor, and Language." Wíčazo Ša Review: A Journal of Native American Studies 15.2 (2000) 27-61 https://muse.jhu.edu/article/36264

External links 

 
 Joy Harjo, U.S. Poet Laureate: A Resource Guide from the Library of Congress
Joy Harjo: Academy of American Poet s
 
 Encyclopedia of Oklahoma History and Culture – Harjo, Joy
 
 Interview with Joe Harjo on BBC Outlook (starting at 26.30)
 Voices of Oklahoma interview. First person interview conducted on November 5, 2020, with Joy Harjo.
 Interview with Joy Harjo on WHYY Fresh Air

1951 births
Living people
Writers from Tulsa, Oklahoma
Muscogee (Creek) Nation people
Native American musicians
Native American poets
American women poets
Institute of American Indian Arts alumni
Native American children's writers
American children's writers
Writers from New Mexico
American women children's writers
Musicians from Tulsa, Oklahoma
PEN Oakland/Josephine Miles Literary Award winners
American Book Award winners
Native American dramatists and playwrights
American Poets Laureate
Native American women writers
American people of Irish descent
American people of French descent
20th-century American women writers
21st-century American women writers
Writers from Oklahoma
Members of the American Philosophical Society
Poets from Oklahoma
20th-century Native Americans
21st-century Native Americans
20th-century Native American women
21st-century Native American women